The following lists events that happened during 1873 in Australia.

Incumbents

Governors
Governors of the Australian colonies:
Governor of New South Wales – Hercules Robinson, 1st Baron Rosmead
Governor of Queensland – George Phipps, 2nd Marquess of Normanby
Governor of South Australia – Sir James Fergusson, 6th Baronet, then Anthony Musgrave
Governor of Tasmania – Charles Du Cane
Governor of Victoria – John Manners-Sutton, 3rd Viscount Canterbury, then George Bowen
Governor of Western Australia – The Hon. Sir Frederick Weld GCMG.

Premiers
Premiers of the Australian colonies:
Premier of New South Wales – Henry Parkes
Premier of Queensland – Arthur Hunter Palmer
Premier of South Australia – Henry Ayers, until 22 July then Arthur Blyth
Premier of Tasmania – Frederick Innes, until 4 August then Alfred Kennerley
Premier of Victoria – James Francis

Events
 9 December – More than 1,000 striking gold miners attack police and Chinese workers brought in to Clunes, Victoria to break the strike.
 30 December – Elizabeth Woolcock is hanged at the Adelaide Gaol, the only woman to be executed in South Australia.

Exploration and settlement
 19 July – Surveyor William Gosse names "Ayers Rock" after the Premier of South Australia Henry Ayers (later changed to its Indigenous name, Uluru).
 3 September – The town of Cooktown, Queensland is founded after gold is discovered at the Palmer River, sparking a gold rush.

Births
 28 January – Monty Noble, cricketer (d. 1940)
 21 August – Fred Leist, artist (d. 1945)
 2 September – Lily Poulett-Harris, founder of women's cricket in Australia (d.  1897)

Deaths
 28 January – John Hart, 10th Premier of South Australia (b. 1809)
 19 April – Hamilton Hume, explorer (b. 1797)
 30 May – Thomas Gilbert, South Australian pioneer (b. 1789)
 22 June – Terence Aubrey Murray, NSW politician (b. 1810)
 12 November – David Lennox, bridge-builder (b. 1788)
 11 December – John West, clergyman, writer and editor of The Sydney Morning Herald (b. 1809)
 24 December – Madame Rens, New South Wales settler and merchant (b. 1789)

References

 
Australia
Years of the 19th century in Australia